Moscow is a city in Stevens County, Kansas, United States.  As of the 2020 census, the population of the city was 272.

History
The settlement of Moscow was established in 1887.

One tradition says, the community was named for a member of de Soto's expedition, the maestro de campo (field commander) Luis de Moscoso (the source mistakenly indicates Francisco Coronado southwest expedition, but at this time Moscoso was a member of de Soto's expedition, furthermore he took command of the expedition after de Soto's death). During the settlement name registration there were a series of mistakes. The residents, in their application for a post office, had shortened it to Mosco. A postal clerk in Washington, upon receipt of their petition, being in a helpful spirit, and thinking the hay-seeds in the west did not know their spelling, added a "w" to the name, changing it to Moscow.

Moscow moved 8 miles to the north in 1913, where in 1912 the CVR railroad was built, so it was also called "New Moscow".

For the first time in the US Census the placename "Moscow" in Stevens County appeared in 1890, though not as a city but as a township. The Census separated city of Moscow in 1930.

Geography
Moscow is located at  (37.3236349, -101.2057164).

The town is located in southwest Kansas in the Rolling Cropland and Range region of the Great Plains. The town is in the shape of a right triangle.

The northwest border of the Moscow adjoins U.S. Route 56.

Demographics

2010 census
As of the census of 2010, there were 310 people, 105 households, and 85 families residing in the city. The racial makeup of the city was 73.2% White, 3.5% Native American, 21.3% from other races, and 1.9% from two or more races. Hispanic or Latino of any race were 38.7% of the population.

There were 105 households, of which 45.7% had children under the age of 18 living with them, 68.6% were married couples living together, 8.6% had a female householder with no husband present, 3.8% had a male householder with no wife present, and 19.0% were non-families. 14.3% of all households were made up of individuals, and 5.7% had someone living alone who was 65 years of age or older. The average household size was 2.95 and the average family size was 3.31.

The median age in the city was 32.5 years. 31% of residents were under the age of 18; 8.7% were between the ages of 18 and 24; 29% were from 25 to 44; 19.7% were from 45 to 64; and 11.6% were 65 years of age or older. The gender makeup of the city was 46.5% male and 53.5% female.

2000 census
As of the census of 2000, there were 247 people, 96 households, and 67 families residing in the city. The racial makeup of the city was 76.52% White, 1.62% African American, 4.45% Native American, 14.98% from other races, and 2.43% from two or more races. Hispanic or Latino of any race were 34.41% of the population.

There were 96 households, out of which 39.6% had children under the age of 18 living with them, 58.3% were married couples living together, 6.3% had a female householder with no husband present, and 30.2% were non-families. 28.1% of all households were made up of individuals, and 13.5% had someone living alone who was 65 years of age or older. The average household size was 2.57 and the average family size was 3.18.

In the city, the population was spread out, with 30.0% under the age of 18, 9.7% from 18 to 24, 28.3% from 25 to 44, 19.4% from 45 to 64, and 12.6% who were 65 years of age or older. The median age was 31 years. For every 100 females, there were 94.5 males. For every 100 females age 18 and over, there were 94.4 males.

The median income for a household in the city was $31,136, and the median income for a family was $33,393. Males had a median income of $30,250 versus $28,750 for females. The per capita income for the city was $13,463. About 7.9% of families and 7.7% of the population were below the poverty line, including 6.6% of those under the age of eighteen and none of those 65 or over.

Education

Primary and secondary education
Moscow is part of USD 209 school district, and contains two schools:
 Moscow Elementary School (pre-K to Sixth grade)
 Moscow High School (Seventh grade to Twelfth grade)

The emblem of the High school is the Wildcat, so students are also called Moscow Wildcats.

The Moscow Wildcats won the Kansas State High School 8-Man football championship in 1978.

Infrastructure

Transportation
The northwest border of the Moscow adjoins U.S. Route 56.

The Cimarron Valley Railroad (CVR) parallels Route 56 and crosses the county from northeast to southwest. CVR is one of several short-line railroads operated by The Western Group.

The Brollier Airport is located east of Moscow. GNIS feature ID 481338.

References

Further reading

External links

 City of Moscow
 Moscow – Directory of Public Officials. League of Kansas Municipalities.
 Moscow City Map, KDOT

Cities in Kansas
Cities in Stevens County, Kansas